Joseph DeCamara (born April 26, 1978) is an American sports radio personality for 94.1 WIP in Philadelphia, who is the host of the WIP Morning Show host. DeCamara began his career as a producer at the radio station WBCB and hosted nationally syndicated shows for ESPN Radio.

Early life and education
DeCamara was born and raised in Philadelphia. His father Phil ran a successful fire sprinkler company. He graduated from St. Joseph's Prep in 1996 and from Fairfield University in 2000 with a degree in history.

Career
Prior to entering sports broadcasting, DeCamara worked at ING Barings as an operations options specialists. DeCamara contacted Tom Bigby, WIP's then-program director, in 2002 asking for a job while also emphasizing that he had "a lot to learn." DeCamara  Bigby responded that if DeCamara was to work at WIP, then "[DeCamara] would not have to find him, he would find [DeCamara]."

In 2002, DeCamara began his radio career as an intern at WBCB a radio station owned by Eagles play-by-play announcer Merrill Reese. Three and a half months into his tenure at WBCB, DeCamara was given a sports radio show on Mondays and Thursdays after Phillies games. His mother produced the show and his four older siblings and uncle were frequent callers. Reese helped secure DeCamara a job in 2003 producing WYSP-FM's Eagle's pre and post-game show.

Beginning in 2004, he worked as Howard Eskin's producer for his show on WIP. DeCamara joined 97.5 The Fanatic as part of their launch in 2005. In 2007, he was promoted to serve as their Assistant Program Director. In 2011, DeCamara began hosting his own show on The Fanatic. DeCamara hosted The Fanatic's Pre-Game Show prior to all Eagles games and a Wednesday weeknight show with Ron Jaworski. The Joe DeCamara show aired from 6:00 PM to 10:00 PM from 2015 to 2016 on The Fanatic. He also worked as a weekend host on ESPN Radio. He says working at ESPN gave him the confidence to believe "I can hang with this group." 

DeCamara worked as an announcer for the Arena Football League. He was the play-by-play announcer for the Philadelphia Soul in 2016 for Comcast SportsNet Philadelphia and a color analyst for ArenaBowl XXX in 2016.

In 2016, DeCamara left The Fanatic to join WIP as their mid-day show host with Jon Ritchie. Spike Eskin, WIP's then-Program Director, said he opted to hire DeCamara because he was impressed by DeCamara's "preparation for his show and his desire to get better." DeCamara hosts a popular trivia show against a caller known as "Beat The Hammer" on Fridays. DeCamara has an 87% win percentage in "Beat the Hammer." 

In 2023, DeCamara and Ritchie were promoted to the WIP Morning Show to replace the legendary radio host Angelo Cataldi, who retired after 33 years on air.

References

External links
Official WIP Web Site

1978 births
Living people
American sports radio personalities
Radio personalities from Philadelphia